Rameshbhai Lavjibhai Dhaduk is an Indian politician and a member of parliament to the 17th Lok Sabha from Porbandar Lok Sabha constituency, Gujarat. He won the 2019 Indian general election being a Bharatiya Janata Party candidate.

References

India MPs 2019–present
Lok Sabha members from Gujarat
Living people
Bharatiya Janata Party politicians from Gujarat
People from Porbandar
1962 births